François-Agénor-Alexandre-Hélie de Noailles, 9th Duke of Noailles (20 November 1905 – 11 January 2009) was the nephew of Adrien-Maurice-Victurnien-Mathieu, 8th duc de Noailles. His parents were Marquis Hélie Guillaume de Noailles (26 May 1871 – 24 May 1932) and Corisande de Gramont (8 August 1880 – 5 March 1977), daughter of Duke de Gramont and Marguerite de Rothschild.

He styled himself duc de Noailles (Duke of Noailles) on the death of his uncle Adrien de Noailles in 1953.

Family
He married Charlotte de Caumont La Force (29 September 1917 – 19 December 2002) in 1936 at Paris. They had one child, a son, who has three children: Hélie-Marie-Auguste-Jacques-Bertrand-Philippe de Noailles, Duke of Ayen (born 1943), who succeeded him upon his death at Château de Champlâtreux in 2009.

References
François, 9th duc de Noailles' obituary  

1905 births
2009 deaths
Dukes of Noailles
Counts of Ayen
Francois
French centenarians
Men centenarians